Sweeney Todd is the debut album by Canadian glam rock band Sweeney Todd. The single "Roxy Roller" reached #1 in the RPM national singles survey on June 26, 1976, and held that position for three weeks. Singer Nick Gilder and guitarist Jim McCulloch later went on to solo careers. They have both since returned to the band.

Track list
 "Roxy Roller"
 "Broadway Boogie"
 "Juicy Loose"
 "Short Distance, Long Journey"
 "The Kilt" (instrumental)
 "Rock'N'Roll Story"
 "Sweeney Todd Folder"
 "See What We're Doing Now"
 "Daydreams"
 "Rue De Chance"
 "Let's Do It All Again"

Personnel
 Nick Gilder: Lead Vocals
 Jim McCulloch: Guitar
 Dan Gaudin: Keyboards
 Budd Marr: Bass
 John Booth: Drums
 Rod Dirk: Engineer 
 Martin Shaer: Producer

Charts

Weekly charts

Year-end charts

References

External links
 Sweeney Todd - Sweeney Todd (1975)

1975 debut albums
Sweeney Todd (band) albums
London Records albums